Galearis is a genus of the orchid family (Orchidaceae) native to North America and eastern Asia. It contains about ten recognized species. The family name comes from the Greek word orchis ('testicle'), in reference to the shape of the root.

Species
 Galearis camtschatica (Cham.) X.H.Jin, Schuit. & W.T.Jin – Japan, Korea, Russian Far East
 Galearis cyclochila (Franch. & Sav.) Soó – China, Japan, Korea, Russian Far East
 Galearis fauriei (Finet) P.F.Hunt – Japan
 Galearis huanglongensis Q.W.Meng & Y.B.Luo – Sichuan
 Galearis roborovskyi (Maxim.) S.C.Chen, P.J.Cribb & S.W.Gale – China, Tibet, Nepal, eastern Himalayas
 Galearis rotundifolia (Banks ex Pursh) R.M.Bateman – Canada, Greenland, northern United States
 Galearis spathulata (Lindl.) P.F.Hunt – China, Himalayas, Nepal, Myanmar
 Galearis spectabilis (L.) Raf. – eastern Canada; eastern and central United States
 Galearis tschiliensis (Schltr.) P.J.Cribb, S.W.Gale & R.M.Bateman – China
 Galearis wardii (W.W.Sm.) P.F.Hunt – China including Tibet

References

External links 

 
Orchideae genera
Orchids of China
Orchids of Russia
Orchids of Japan
Orchids of Korea
Orchids of Nepal
Orchids of Myanmar
Flora of East Himalaya
Flora of West Himalaya
Flora of Tibet
Orchids of Canada
Flora of Alaska
Flora of Greenland
Orchids of the United States